Vezmestan-e Olya (also Romanized as Vezmestān-e ‘Olyā; also known as Vazmestān, Vezmestān, and Wazmistān) is a village in Hendudur Rural District, Sarband District, Shazand County, Markazi Province, Iran. At the 2006 census, its population was 167, in 50 families.

References 

Populated places in Shazand County